The Senussi campaign took place in North Africa from November 1915 to February 1917, during the First World War. The campaign was fought by the Kingdom of Italy and the British Empire against the Senussi, a religious order of Arabic nomads in Libya and Egypt. The Senussi were courted by the Ottoman Empire and the German Empire. In the summer of 1915, the Ottomans persuaded the Grand Senussi Ahmed Sharif as-Senussi to declare jihad, attack British-occupied Egypt from the west and to encourage insurrection in Egypt to divert British forces.

The Senussi crossed the Libyan–Egyptian border in November 1915 and fought a campaign along the Egyptian coast. At first British Empire forces withdrew, then defeated the Senussi in several engagements, culminating in the action of Agagia and the re-capture of the coast in March 1916. In the interior, the band of oases campaign continued until February 1917, after which a peace was negotiated and the area became a backwater for the rest of the war, patrolled by British aircraft and armoured cars.

Background

Senussi

Before 1906, when the Senussi became involved in resistance against the French, they had been a "relatively peaceful religious sect of the Sahara Desert, opposed to fanaticism". In the Italo-Turkish War  Italian forces occupied enclaves along the Libyan coast and the Senussi resisted from the interior, maintaining generally friendly relations with the British in Egypt. In 1913, the Italians had been defeated at the action of Etangi but in 1914 Italian reinforcements led to a revival and by January the Senussi were in south-eastern Cyrenaica. The Senussi had about  armed with modern rifles, with ammunition from a factory which produced  a day. Intermittent fighting continued between the Italians in fortified towns and the Senussi ranging through the desert. The British declared war on the Ottoman Empire on 5 November and the leadership of the Ottoman Empire encouraged the Senussi to attack Egypt from the west. The Ottomans wanted the Senussi to conduct operations against the rear of the defenders of the Suez Canal; the Ottomans had failed in previous attacks against British forces from Sinai in the east and wanted them to be distracted by attacks from the opposite direction.

Ottoman Empire

In February 1915, Turkish envoys, including Nuri Bey, the half brother of Enver Pasha and Jaafar Pasha, a Baghdadi Arab in the Ottoman army, plotted to provoke trouble between Sayyid Ahmed ash-Sharif, the Grand Senussi and the British, by planning a raid on Sollum on 15 June but was thwarted. Nuri eventually gained command of Senussi military forces and began training the recruits of Aulad Ali. The Ottoman envoys negotiated an agreement with the Grand Senussi, in which his followers were to attack the British in Egypt from the west, although his decision was not supported by every Senussi. The Ottomans provided machine-guns and artillery using ships and German submarines, to deliver weapons, equipment and money. By November 1915, the size of the British garrison in Egypt was much reduced by the expeditions to Gallipoli and Mesopotamia. The Western Frontier of Egypt was protected by the Egyptian Coastguard (Lieutenant-Colonel C. L. Snow), whose commander was responsible for maintaining good relations with the local Bedouin and the Senussi.

Terrain

The western frontier of Egypt had not been defined in 1914 because negotiations with the Ottomans had been interrupted by the Italo-Turkish War (1911–1912) and then negated by the cession of Tripoli to Italy. A notional frontier ran south from Sollum, to the east of which was an area of  all desert south of the semi-desert coastal strip but with several oases, some quite big and supporting sizeable populations, administered by the Egyptian government. Bedouin (Arab nomads) moved between the oases, traded with the inhabitants and took refuge at them when wells ran dry.

Along the Mediterranean coast of Egypt is a strip of land, well-enough watered to support grazing for camels and sheep; digging for water generally succeeds but wells and cisterns are often far apart and sometimes unexpectedly run dry. The earth is dusty in summer and glutinous in the rainy season from December to March, when the days are relatively cool and night bitter cold. To the south lies the desert, with sand dunes for several hundred miles.

A standard-gauge railway ran along the coast from Alexandria, intended to terminate at Sollum, which in 1915 had reached Dabaa. A track, known as the Khedival Motor Road, fit for motor vehicles in dry weather, continued to the frontier, although when hostilities began the wet season was imminent.

Prelude

Senussi–Ottoman preparations
German and Turkish officers made their headquarters at Siwa Oasis with a Senussi force of  supported by mountain guns and machine-guns, to attack Sollum, Mersa Matruh and El Dabaa on the coast and the oases further south at Bahariya, Farafra, Dakhla and Kharga. On 15 August, a British submarine commander saw people onshore near Sollum and was fired on when he went to investigate, which caused a diplomatic incident until the Senussi pretended that the party mistook the submarine for an Italian boat. Sir John Maxwell, the commander of British troops in Egypt, pretended to believe the excuse, assuming that it had been a provocation to force the Grand Senussi's hand. Soon after, the Senussi began training around Sollum with artillery and machine-guns and then Maxwell obtained documents from the Grand Senussi to Muslim leaders and journalists in Arabia and India, urging Jihad.

The British continued to appease the Senussi, being in negotiations with the Sherif of Mecca and reluctant to inflame Muslim opinion. On 30 September, Snow met with the Grand Senussi and Jaafar Pasha, who discussed the undisciplined nature of desert nomads but Snow judged the Senussi forces to be potentially formidable. Soon afterwards, news arrived of another Senussi victory over the Italians near Tripoli and the capture of much weaponry and money. Senussi aggression against the British escalated in November, when German submarines torpedoed an armed steamer  and the transport ship Moorina, then handed over the crews to the Senussi at Port Suleiman in Cyrenaica. Sayed Ahmed affected ignorance when the British complained and negotiations began to persuade the Grand Senussi to dismiss the Ottoman envoys for money but German submarine raids encouraged Senussi intransigence.

On 6 November, Egyptian coastguard boats in Sollum bay were attacked by SM U-35, Abbas was sunk and Nuhr el Bahr was damaged. On the night of 17 November, Senussi fired into the camp at Sollum, two Bedouin were murdered and the coast telegraph was cut. Sayed Ahmed ordered his followers to cross the Egyptian frontier by 21 November, to conduct the coastal campaign. On the night of  the barracks at Sollum was fired on and a coastguard was killed.

British preparations

The British commanders adopted a policy of avoiding reverses, before attempting to defeat the Senussi. Mersa Matruh (Matruh) was  closer to Alexandria and had a good water supply. The Western Frontier posts were ordered back to Matruh to concentrate and to be reinforced by troops moved along the coast by trawler and on the Khedival Railway as far as Dabaa,  short of Matruh. On 21 November, the 2nd Battalion New Zealand Rifle Brigade, a company of the 15th Sikhs, parties of the Bikanir Camel Corps and an armoured train crewed by Egyptian gunners, was sent to Dabaa to guard the railway and patrol to the Moghara Oasis.

As soon as Sollum was evacuated, ships arrived full of munitions for the Senussi.

Senussi campaign

Coast

Affair of the Wadi Seinab

On 11 December, Wallace sent a column (Lieutenant-Colonel J. L. R. Gordon) from Matruh to Duwwar Hussein  to the west, with infantry, artillery and four armoured cars, three Ford light cars and a wireless car from the Royal Naval Armoured Car Division, the Composite Yeomanry Regiment and most of the Composite Infantry Brigade. The cavalry had moved about  when they received small-arms fire from the right and tried to outflank their assailants, with support from the armoured cars but the column was recalled due to the volume of fire being received. The artillery joined in and an Australian Light Horse squadron arrived, after which the Senussi were driven back from the Wadi Senab. The force of about  lost  killed and seven prisoners against  and  one of whom was Snow, killed trying to capture a wounded Bedouin. Gordon heard the engagement and received a message dropped from an aeroplane but with the distance, quantity of baggage and small size of his force, decided to rely on Wallace marching from Matruh and continued to Umm er Rakham, where the cavalry rallied for the night.

They were identified as Senussi and observed advancing in open order and firing from behind cover, eventually being seen to be a large force. Gordon ordered the main body to stop the Senussi advance while the advanced guard and cavalry enveloped the Senussi left flank. As both sides manoeuvred, the Senussi party appeared to be  strong and at  the infantry were supported by two field guns and three machine-guns.

The column returned to Matruh next day, much exhausted; the Senussi had been repulsed but got away, having managed to spring a surprise and attack with vigour. The British concluded that had the rest of the column been as well-trained as the 15th Sikhs, the Senussi defeat would have been greater.

Affair of the Wadi Majid

The weather from  prevented operations from Matruh and the time was used for organisation and the WFF was reinforced by the 1st battalion New Zealand Rifle Brigade. A B.E.2c air observer of 14 Squadron sketched the Senussi encampment and copies were used by the ground commanders. Jaafar wrote later that there were three battalions of Muhafizia with  each, four mountain guns and two machine-guns, which had been sent to Dabaa to cut communications with Alexandria. Both forces were accompanied by Bedouin irregulars, who could be relied on to join in, if the Senussi defeated the British.

The right column was to advance direct to Gebel Medwa and the left column was to move via Wadi Toweiwia south of Matruh, then west round the Senussi flank to cut off their retreat. An Azalea-class sloop, HMS Clematis was to provide gunfire support to any target in range. The right column moved forward silently but at  Senussi outposts raised the alarm and engaged the column which stopped until the light improved. Many Senussi could be seen in the hills to the south and south-east but not on Gebel Medwa, due to the sudden appearance of the British. The Gebel Medwa was occupied to guard the right flank and then the advance was to continue down the road, when a Senussi field gun fired on the road with some accuracy.

By  the Sikhs had closed to within  of the main Senussi position and saw that they were retiring so pressed on with the 1st New Zealand Rifles and took the ridge by  Some Senussi were trapped in caves and gullies and killed as artillery bombarded the rest of the Senussi during their retreat. Eventually machine-gun fire forced back the covering party but the column did not resume the advance until  and then tried to cut off small parties. Attempts to signal the left column to advance direct to Wadi Majid took until near  to arrive and the cavalry took until  to reach the wadi, by when the Senussi had escaped. The infantry had killed about  captured  and then burned the encampment.

The British faced north against the Senussi rearguard backed against the sea but most of the Senussi had retreated westwards with their livestock and as dark fell, the rearguard was able to slip away from Wadi Senab and Wadi Majid along the rocky shore, where the cavalry could not follow. At  Gordon ended the pursuit and ordered the infantry to bivouac at Gebel Medwa and the cavalry to return to Matruh. The defeat lowered Senussi prestige but the inability of the British cavalry to exploit the victory, left the Senussi main body intact. Several Indian prisoners taken from the Moorina, escaped from the Senussi in the confusion and returned to their units; Wallace was able to begin operations between Matruh and Dabaa after a brief rest.

Affair of Halazin

The column returned on 30 December, having met no resistance, with Bedouin fleeing as the column approached. The rain stopped on 9 January but it took a day for the ground to recover and a mixed column reached Baqqush late on 13 January. Next day, the camp was found to be deserted but smaller camps were found with camels and livestock; the tents were burned and the livestock looted before the column returned to Baqqush.

The WFF advanced on 22 January to Bir Shola  to the south-west and moved on Halazin in two columns, next morning. The infantry column on the right followed a compass bearing towards the camp and the cavalry moved forward in echelon on the left flank. It rained and the baggage train was left behind, motor ambulances bogged down and the armoured cars were sent back to Matruh. After a  advance, the Senussi were seen and an hour later the infantry attacked as the cavalry were sent against the Senussi right flank. The Senussi were thought to be retiring on a prepared position with considerable skill, also handling three guns and five machine-guns well. A party of Senussi appeared on the British right and then another party appeared on the left as British the right flank guard was driven back under machine-gun fire. New Zealand reinforcements were sent to the flank with machine-guns and stopped the Senussi attack but were then outflanked and reinforced again.

The Sikh advance in the centre had continued as the flanks were pushed back but the Sikh, South African and New Zealand infantry pressed on and at  reached the Senussi entrenchments, at which the defenders gave way and retreated into the desert. The cavalry were not able to pursue when the Senussi on the flanks retreated, for lack of water for the horses and the condition of the ground made an armoured car pursuit impossible. The British set up a bivouac close by and the troops spent the night without shelter or food. The column returned to Bir Shola, through even worse mud and wounded men who could not sit on horses were carried by stretcher. The night of 24 January was also wet but conditions were much better, with food water and tents for the wounded.

Action of Agagia

In February 1916, a seaplane carrier,  was sent from Port Said; on 11 February, its aircraft observed Sidi Barrani and Sollum and on 15 February discovered the Senussi were encamped at Agagia. The Western Frontier Force (Major-General William Peyton), was reinforced by the 1st South African Brigade (Brigadier-General Henry Lukin) and a British column under Lukin advanced west along the coast to re-capture Sollum in February. En route, a Senussi encampment at Agagia was spotted by aircraft. On 26 February, the column attacked the Senussi and captured Jaafar Pasha, commander of the Senussi forces on the coast. As the Senussi retreated, they were cut off by a Dorset Yeomanry cavalry charge; the Yeomen lost half their horses and about a third of the riders ( who took part) but dispersed the column, caused about  took  captured the Senussi baggage train and pursued the survivors into the desert.

Re-occupation of Sollum

After burying the dead and resting the survivors, Lukin advanced to Sidi Barrani and entered unopposed on 28 February. On 2 March, two reconnaissance aircraft was sent from Matruh and on 8 March the aircraft flew to Sidi Barrani to search from Sidi Barrani to Sollum. The WFF had gained a base  further west than Matruh but could only land supplies in good weather and had to rely on the overland route until the navy caught up. As soon as the British were established at Sidi Barrani, Lukin returned as many horses and gunners as possible to reduce the demand for food, which by camel convoy took four days and needed  for each journey. Delivery of supplies by sea was complicated by the fear of German submarines but had been completed by 4 March, which made it feasible to return the bulk of the WFF to Sidi Barrani by 7 March.

Reconnaissance flights by the RFC found small camps near the escarpments but no signs of defensive works at the passes. The slower moving infantry were to set off on 9 March, to arrive at dawn on 12 March and capture the Median and Eragib passes. The horsed column of the 2nd Mounted Brigade, artillery and the camel corps, were to leave on 11 March and rendezvous with Lukin on 13 March at Augerin. The infantry column reached Buq Buq on 11 March, the cavalry reached Alem abu Sheiba and next day the infantry column reached Augerin and armoured cars occupied the Median and Eragib passes. The water supply was found to be insufficient for the cavalry column or all of the infantry. Peyton ordered Lukin to advance with two battalions and artillery and send the rest back to Buq Buq with the cavalry column, to join with Peyton and make a slow advance along the coast. Lukin advanced with the 1st and 4th South African battalions, the Hong Kong Mountain Battery and a Field Ambulance detachment. Next day, the reduced force ascended the plateau via the passes to Bir el Siwiat.

During 13 March, the forces with Peyton advanced to Bir Tegdida,  from Sollum but the cavalry remained at Buq Buq, after an erroneous report of insufficient water at Tegdida. Next day, the three columns concentrated near Halfaya Pass,  short of Sollum, the cavalry having caught up and the battalions with Lukin carrying water on camels. Peyton sent the 2nd South African Infantry Battalion up the pass to join Lukin and continued along the coast. The approach march turned into an anti-climax as the Senussi departed from Sollum before the columns arrived and supply ships arrived next day. The Duke of Westminster's armoured cars pressed on to Bir Waer, which air reconnaissance reported to have been abandoned, to pursue the Senussi westwards.

The Senussi could not stand their ground and apart from a small Ottoman contingent, fled into the desert. In Sollum, a letter from Captain R. S. Gwatkin-Williams, the commander of the Tara was found, giving the whereabouts of the survivors of the vessels sunk the previous November. The  were fed then driven back to an Australian Camel Corps outpost at Bir Waer. Next day the liberated prisoners went back to Alexandria, having reported that they had not been mistreated but had suffered from the famine caused by the military operations in the region and that four of the prisoners had died, mainly from hunger.

Minor operations

The Senussi defeats in the coastal campaign forced the survivors over the border into Libya and to prevent a revival, the light Fords and armoured cars continued their patrols. The Aulad Ali surrendered to Peyton, having also gone hungry in the famine and public unrest in Alexandria diminished. The South African Brigade returned to Alexandria and two battalions of the Composite Brigade, a company of the Camel Corps, two guns of the Hong Kong Battery, the light armoured cars and the reconnaissance aircraft remained in Sollum, with an RFC half-flight. The party was scattered and served as a warning that there was no sanctuary on either side of the border. Patrols continued for the year and a camel convoy was captured near Jaghbub, a Senussi stronghold  from Sollum; more Italian–British raids were made during the winter.

Band of oases

The southern route goes south-east through Farafra and Dakhla to the large oasis of Kharga,  from Suhag on the Nile. On 11 February 1916,  and Sayyid Ahmed ash-Sharif occupied the oasis at Bahariya, just before Peyton was ready to begin a march from Matruh to Sollum. The Senussi were seen by air observers from a 17 Squadron detachment at Faiyum. Next day the aircraft bombed the oasis with eight  bombs and a reconnaissance flight three days later found no Senussi.

The British reinforced the detachments covering the Nile Valley and named the command Southern Force (Major-General J. Adye) based at Beni Suef, conveniently placed to resist an advance from the west. The defeats inflicted on the Senussi during the coastal campaign made it possible to extend the garrisons southwards and at the end of March, the south end of the line of posts was at Isna. Egyptian officials at Kharga, where there was a light railway connecting with the main line along the Nile, were withdrawn when Dakhla was occupied. No attempt was made to attack the Senussi but frequent reconnaissance sorties by aircraft kept watch. By 19 March, Senussi defeats on the coast had lowered Senussi morale.

Murray ordered an extension of the light railway from Kharga to the Moghara Oasis, a new light railway from the Nile at Beni Mazar to Bahariya and the building of a line of blockhouses along the Darb el Rubi track from Samalut to Bahariya, the route of the new railway. The Imperial Camel Corps had been formed in November 1915 mainly from companies of the 1st Australian Division and 2nd Australian Division, the Australian Light Horse, New Zealand troops, British Yeomanry and Territorial infantry. The corps became the principal force in the defence of western Egypt, combining camel transport and motor vehicles. Patrols of light Ford cars and light armoured motor batteries revolutionised the occupation of the Western Desert, increasing the range of patrols from tens of miles by camel to hundreds of miles by vehicle. Because of the distances involved, patrols operated independently but proved so effective that the Senussi were quickly cut off from the Nile Valley and isolated in the oases they still occupied.

Affairs in the Dakhla Oasis

By late May 1916, four blockhouses had been built along the Darb el Rubi track and slow progress had been made building the railway to Bahariya. News leaked to Sayed Ahmed, who had advanced from Dakhla to Bahariya with most of his force, which was weakened by illness and hunger and Ahmed retreated to Siwa from 8 to 10 October. The Western Force tried to trap the Senussi rearguard west of Bahariya with a force of light cars but the distance and bad going enabled the Senussi to get away. The British realised that the garrison at Dakhla was much smaller and likely to retire soon and Watson decided to attack from Kharga.

The force contained sixty men with a Rolls-Royce Armoured Car and a tender, six Fords and twelve motorbikes, two Vickers guns and two Lewis guns, to be followed by a company of the Camel Corps, which could not arrive for  after the cars. The company of the Camel Corps arrived at Bir Sheikh Mohammed at the west end of Dakhla on 19 March and took another forty prisoners. The British began to patrol all round and took another fifty prisoners and some politically suspect civilians; by the end of March, the oasis and its  had been cleared of the Senussi. Garrisons were installed at Dakhla and Bahariya and civilian government resumed; in November an expedition to Farafra took more prisoners.

Raid on Siwa

In January 1917, Murray learned that Sayed Ahmed intended to retire from Siwa to Jaghbub with his  and on 21 January, ordered an operation to capture him and inflict losses on his remaining followers. The Girba and Siwa oases are almost contiguous, Girba lying north-west of Siwa. The main Senussi force was based at Girba and Hodgson planned to attack while a detachment of armoured motor batteries blocked Munassib Pass near Gagaib,  to the north-west. The Girba–Jaghbub track descends from the plateau through the pass. The British anticipated that the Senussi would retreat along the pass and be trapped.

The cars surprised the Senussi who exchanged fire but then the British found that the ground was too rough to get closer than  until later in the day, when some cars managed to work forward another  and maintain machine-gun fire on the Senussi defences. The night was quiet until  when the Senussi opened fire and began to burn their stores. As dawn broke, the Senussi were seen retiring through a pass to the rear and disappeared. The raiders destroyed the camp and sent patrols towards Siwa, entering next day unopposed, where the inhabitants appeared happy to be rid of the Senussi.

On 4 February, the party ambushed a convoy from the west carrying mail and on the next day met the advanced parties of Senussi retreating from Girba. The raiders were foiled when the Senussi held them off and diverted convoys following on behind, through sand dunes around the pass. The cars returned to the rendezvous and the raiders estimated that they had killed forty Senussi, forty camels and inflicted  Rifles and equipment had been destroyed for three British members of the party wounded. The force returned to Matruh on 8 February as Sayyid Ahmed withdrew to Jaghbub. Negotiations between Sayed Idris and the British and Italians at Tobruk, which had begun in late January, were galvanised by news of the Senussi defeat at Siwa. At Akramah on 12 April, Idris acted on British insinuations that they regarded him as the legitimate Senussi leader and that Sayed Ahmed was a nuisance, accepted British terms and settled with Italy on 14 April.

Italian Libya

After the open resumption of aid deliveries to the Senussi from the Ottoman Empire in July 1915, Italy responded with a declaration of war on 21 August. Hostilities allowed Italy formally to rescind all the privileges the Ottoman sultan enjoyed in Libya under the Treaty of Ouchy (17 October 1912), that had ended the first Italo-Turkish War (1911–1912). The British blockaded the Cyrenaica coast to prevent supplies being landed by Greek boats at first and then German submarines from late 1915, guarding the Cyrenaica–Egyptian border to prevent arms smuggling, which was being done openly by the Ottomans with German connivance. The need for troops on the Italian Front led to the Italian occupation force being reduced from  men in the area around Tripoli, which was pacified by resorting to atrocities. The hinterland and the coastal strip was depopulated from Khums to Benghazi, Derna and Tobruk.

The fortress of Bu Njem, which had only captured from its Ottoman garrison in 1914, was the forward Italian post in the Sirtica. The interior was either evacuated (Waddan, Hun and Suknan) or its posts left to isolated garrisons besieged by the Senussi and Bedouin. The Senussi objective of expelling the Italians, coincided with Ottoman war aims. In 1914, the British chose to appease the Senussi but the accession of Italy to the entente in May 1915 led to the British applying pressure to the Senussi to recognise the Italian occupation and stopping cross-border trade. The Senussi became more dependent on German and Ottoman imports and had to move to find food. The attempt by Mannesmann, a German agent, to fabricate a diplomatic incident on 15 August failed but the economic crisis caused by the British embargo pushed the Senussi towards war. The Ottoman sultan appointed Sayed Ahmed the governor of Tripolitania and Ahmed published the caliphal decree of jihad against the infidel British and their allies.

Cyrenaica

On 29 April 1915, Colonel Antonio Miani and force-marching from the Sirtica, was defeated by the Senussi at Gasr Bu Hadi (Qasr bu Hadi or Al Ghardabiya), with  The materiel captured was enormous, calculated at  rifle and machine gun rounds,  pieces, twenty machine guns,   shells, and  The Senussi captured more Italian arms than those delivered by the Ottomans and Germans. The Italians soon abandoned Bu Njem and in 1916, a Senussi contingent commanded by Ramadan al-Shtaiwi invaded Tripolitania. The Senussi routed a Bedouin group led by Sayed Safi al-Din at Bani Walid before Sayed Idris recalled the force and accepted the notion of a western limit of Senussi power. Idris established a khatt al-nar (line of fire) across the Sirtica, to prevent raiding by al-Shtaiwi and his forces, who were armed by the Italians and whose goal was to re-establish themselves inland.

In March 1916, Sayed Hilal, a young relative of Sayed Ahmed, presented himself to the Italians at Tobruk, ostensibly seeking food for the starving peoples of the Marmarica. The Italians induced him to convince the Aibadat people to surrender  in exchange for food. His good offices were used to enter the port of al-Burdi Sulaiman unopposed in May and then Sayed Ahmed's old camp at Masa'ad. His activities disgraced Sayed Idris and negotiations between an Anglo-Italian commission and Idris at al-Zuwaitina broke down. The British launched an offensive and by early 1917, talks resumed at Akrama (Acroma) and Accords of Acroma were agreed in April. The questions of disarming the populace and of the status of Islamic law were left for the future but the fighting in Cyrenaica came to an end.

Tripolitania

Italian troops captured Ghat in the south-west of the province in August 1914, which prompted an uprising and forced the Italians out of Ghat and Ghadames. The call to jihad had more effect among the Senussi than elsewhere and Ahmad began the jihad in Fezzan in southern Libya. The Italians re-captured Ghadames in February 1916 but the blockade on the Senussi had little military effect, since they were well stocked with captured Italian weapons; Italian garrisons in Cyrenaica were withdrawn to reinforce the west. Ottoman–German operations in Tripolitania were based at Misratah, where a submarine visited every couple of weeks to deliver arms and ammunition and in May 1917 a wireless station was built. Ottoman troops established about twenty posts on the coast and by 1918 had  troops, a similar number in training and another  reservists. In September 1918, having been prevented from entering Tripolitania by the Ottoman forces, Sayed Ahmed boarded a German submarine at al-Aqaila and went into exile in Turkey. In Tripolitania, local troops under al-Shtaiwi and Ottoman regular soldiers under Nuri Bey and Suliman al-Baruni, resisted the Italians until the end of the war. Archaeological analysis of the salt pan of Kallaya, the site of a minor skirmish between Libyans on 14 November 1918, shows that they had Russian rifles captured by the Germans and Austro-Hungarians on the Eastern front and sent to Libya via the Ottomans.

Invasion of Tunisia

On 13 September 1915, a Senussi commander Khalifa ben Asker invaded the French Protectorate of Tunisia taking Dehiba south of Tataouine. The French distracted by the rebellion in southern Algeria had left the south of Tunisia undefended. The Senussi found little support from the local population and the Senussi leaderships were angry at Khalifa ben Asker for drawing the French into battle. They viewed their war as only against the Italians and British and didn't want to anger the French. Khalifa ben Asker was arrested by the Senussi and their forces withdrew from Tunisia.

Aftermath

Analysis

The affairs and actions in the Western Desert were small engagements and when the Senussi began hostilities, the garrison of Egypt had been depleted by the campaigns in Sinai and Gallipoli. The total of British and Commonwealth forces was about  but only  part in the action of Agagia. The campaign was fought using traditional methods of warfare juxtaposed with modern technology, a process begun by the Italians who had pioneered the military use of aeroplanes in the Italo-Turkish War. In 1915, the British exploited the internal combustion engine to drive on the desert and fly over it, adding a new dimension of speed and mobility to their operations, which was beyond the capacity of the Senussi to challenge. The British integrated naval operations with the air and ground campaign as well as using older methods of warfare, with camels as beasts of burden to increase the range of ground troops and by conducting espionage and sowing dissent among the Senussi leaders and their Ottoman and German sponsors. Light car patrols and light armoured motor batteries made long-distance patrols and raids, collecting information and surprising the Senussi, who soon lost contact with the Nile Valley and were then isolated in the captured oases, until overrun or forced out by starvation and disease. In 2001, Strachan described the hostilities in Libya as a war independent of the First World War, beginning in 1911 and ending in 1931. A colonial land-grab was resisted by the local population, which developed into a national liberation movement. The technological superiority of the British and the huge, sparsely inhabited space of the desert, were conditions for mobility and decisive action, the opposite of the effects of industrialised warfare in Europe. The equipment and methods which defeated rapidly the Senussi in 1915 and 1916 were adopted in Sinai, Palestine and Syria from 1917 to 1918.

Casualties

Peace

By March 1917, Senussi forces had been ordered to withdraw from Egypt into Libya. The attack by the Senussi on Egypt had not helped the Ottoman Empire to defeat the British east of the Suez Canal and the majority of the Egyptian population did not join the jihad and rise against the British. Sayed Ahmed was undermined by the defeat and his nephew, Sayyid Mohammed Idris, who had opposed the campaign, gained favour at his expense. The peace deal between the British and the Senussi agreed on 12 April 1917, recognised Idris as Emir of Cyrenaica (who eventually became King Idris I of Libya). Idris was required to hand over all British, Egyptian or Allied citizens who had been shipwrecked and to surrender or expel Ottoman officers and their allies. A force of fifty police was allowed at Jaghbub but no other military force could be allowed there, at Siwa or in Egypt. The British undertook to allow trade through Sollum and that although Jaghbub would remain Egyptian, it would be under the administration of Idris, as long as the undertaking not to allow military forces to enter Egypt was honoured. Two days later, Idris came to terms with the Italians and signed a modus vivendi, after which the Western Frontier remained calm for the rest of the war. Sayed Ahmed lingered for a year; in August 1918 he travelled to Constantinople by Austro-Hungarian submarine and conducted Pan-Islamic propaganda.

Orders of battle

WFF, Affair of the Wadi Majid

All units from Macmunn and Falls: Military Operations Egypt and Palestine volume I (1996 [1928]) unless specified.

Right Column
Lieutenant-Colonel J. L. R. Gordon
 Royal Bucks Hussars
 1 Section, Notts Battery RHA
 15th Sikhs
 1st New Zealand Rifle Brigade
 2/8th Middlesex
Notts and Derby Field Ambulance
Water Section, Australian Train

Left Column
Brigadier-General J. D. T. Tyndale-Briscoe
Brigade Staff and Signal Troop, Composite Yeomanry Brigade
 2 Troops Duke of Lancaster's Own Yeomanry
 1 Troops Derbyshire Yeomanry
 2 Troops City of London Yeomanry
 1 Squadron Herts Yeomanry
 Composite Regiment Australian Light Horse
 Notts Battery RHA (less one Section)
 Yeomanry Machine-Gun Section
 Yeomanry Field Ambulance

Senussi, WFF

All units from Macmunn and Falls: Military Operations Egypt and Palestine volume I (1996 [1928]) unless specified. Later information suggested that there were 

January 1914
 Derna district
 3,000 paid regulars
 6,000 volunteers (unpaid)
 Benghazi district
 3,000 paid regulars
 5,000 volunteers
 Tripoli district
 600 African soldiers
 800 Zowai Arabs
 1,000 Tuareg

20 November 1915
 Composite Yeomanry Brigade (Brigadier-General Tyndale Biscoe)
 3 Composite yeomanry regiments from the 2nd Mounted Division, comprising details from more than twenty regiments
 1 Composite regiment of Australian Light Horse, made up of details from Australian light horse brigades
 1/1st Nottinghamshire Royal Horse Artillery
 Ammunition Column
 Composite Infantry Brigade (Brigadier-General Lord Lucan)
 1/6th Battalion Royal Scots (Territorial)
 2/7th Battalion Middlesex Regiment (Territorial)
 2/8th Battalion Middlesex Regiment (Territorial)
 15th Ludhiana Sikhs
 1 Squadron Royal Flying Corps
 Divisional Train from the 1st Australian Division
 Detachment from the Egyptian Army Military Works Department took the place of the Royal Engineers, none of the latter being available.

The composition of the force was frequently changed and it was not until the middle of February 1916, that it settled. Other units attached to the WFF included:
 1st South African Infantry Brigade
 2nd Battalion New Zealand Rifle Brigade
 Bikaner Camel Corps
 Imperial Camel Corps
 The Duke of Westminster's armoured car unit
 Armoured train manned by the Egyptian Artillery
 1/1st North Midland Mounted Brigade plus attached artillery
 6th Mounted Brigade
 22nd Mounted Brigade
 2nd Dismounted (Yeomanry) Brigade
 3rd Dismounted (Yeomanry) Brigade
 4th Dismounted (Yeomanry) Brigade
 Reconnaissance aircraft
 Auxiliary troops

Notes

Footnotes

References

Books
 
 
 
 
 
 
 
 
 
 
 

Journals
 

Websites

Further reading

Books
 
 
 
 
 
 
 
 
 
 
 
 

Journals
 
 
 
 

Websites

External links

 Photograph of Gafaar Pasha as a prisoner
 The Western Desert: Agagia Campaign
 Um Rakhum Egypt, 13 December 1915
 Gebel Medwa Egypt, 13 December 1915
 Halazin Egypt, 23 January 1916
 Armoured Car Sections and Light Car Patrols

Military history of Libya
Libya in World War I
Egypt in World War I
Conflicts in 1915
Conflicts in 1916
Conflicts in 1917
20th century in Libya
Senussi dynasty
Campaigns and theatres of World War I